Hobbs' tree frog (Boana hobbsi) is a species of frog in the family Hylidae found in Colombia, Venezuela, and possibly Brazil. Its natural habitats are subtropical or tropical moist lowland forests and rivers. It is threatened by habitat loss.

References

hobbsi
Amphibians of Colombia
Amphibians of Venezuela
Amphibians described in 1970
Taxonomy articles created by Polbot